Karl Barufka (15 May 1921 – 4 April 1999) was a German footballer who played as a midfielder for Schalke 04, SpVgg Wilhelmshaven, VfB Stuttgart and 1. FC Pforzheim.

External links

1921 births
1999 deaths
German footballers
Association football midfielders
Germany international footballers
FC Schalke 04 players
1. FC Pforzheim players
VfB Stuttgart players
Sportspeople from Gelsenkirchen
Footballers from North Rhine-Westphalia
West German footballers